The Port Hudson State Historic Site is located on the Mississippi River north of Baton Rouge in East Feliciana Parish, Louisiana, just outside the limits of Port Hudson and in the vicinity of Jackson. The site preserves a portion of the fortifications and battle area of the longest siege in American history, during the American Civil War from May 23 through July 9, 1863.  The state of Louisiana maintains the site, which includes a museum about the siege, artillery displays, redoubts, and interpretive plaques. Historical reenactments are held each year. It was designated a National Historic Landmark in 1974, significant as the first place where African-American military units fought for the Union Army under African-American field leadership.

Description
Port Hudson State Historic Site is located north of the community of Port Hudson, on the west side of United States Route 61. The property of the site extends west to Thompson Creek, and is bounded on the north by Sandy Creek and partly on the south by Foster Creek. The area immediately to the southwest of Foster Creek has similar terrain, and is where Confederate defensive positions were located. These positions were but a small portion of the total offensive and defensive positions, which entirely ringed the community, and included artillery emplacements overlooking the nearby Mississippi River.

History
The Siege of Port Hudson was part of a concerted Union effort to gain full control of the Mississippi River.  It was conducted May 22 – July 9, 1863 by forces under the command of Major General Nathaniel Prentice Banks, and only ended because the Confederate General Franklin Gardner surrendered after learning of the fall of Vicksburg, Mississippi to Union forces.  General Banks gave orders to two units composed entirely of African Americans, the 1st and 3rd Louisiana Native Guards, to attack the Confederate positions south of Foster Creek on the morning of May 27.  There was in Union military circles some question about how these units would perform, which were among the first to include African-American field commanders.  The units acquitted themselves well, reaching to within  of the Confederate batteries three times before being repulsed.  The overall attack plan ordered by Banks was a failure, in part due to the piecemeal, disorganized, and uncoordinated execution of its elements.  The units that fought against this position suffered 37 killed, 155 wounded, and 116 missing (out of just over 1,000 men deployed), and remained in the field until ordered to retreat at 4:00 PM.

Soldiers' reburial

In 1997 a dedication ceremony was held to pay tribute to all soldiers who died at the siege.  A group of Civil War reenactors and a modern military honor guard escorted a gun carrier, which bore a wooden coffin containing the sparse remains of victims of both sides.  Following the ceremony, the coffin was lowered to its final resting place beneath a single obelisk.  The remains were found during an archaeological study began in 1987 to authenticate if graves of soldiers existed at the historic Port Hudson cemetery.  Testing in the first season of the study found Confederate and Union buttons confirming the graves were military.  An individual buried in a uniform with Union eagle buttons was probably a Union soldier who breached the line and was shot at close range receiving buck shot in the abdominal region.

Plaque on the monument reads:

Archaeology surveys

A survey of Union Siege Battery 8 was conducted by archaeology students from Louisiana State University.  Goals of the survey included locating the exact boundaries of the battery and finding evidence of a zigzag trench, or sap, that historical accounts say the Union troops dug from the battery to a short distance from the Confederate lines.  The project will also produce a digital topographical map of the area so that park staff may overlay with historical maps.

Battery 8 is located in the northeast portion of the Union Siege lines (view 1864 map).

Gallery

See also
 Siege of Port Hudson
 Port Hudson National Cemetery
 List of National Historic Landmarks in Louisiana
 National Register of Historic Places listings in East Feliciana Parish, Louisiana
 Audubon State Historic Site
 Locust Grove State Historic Site
 List of Louisiana state historic sites

Notes

External links
 
 Port Hudson State Historic Site - official site at Louisiana State Parks website
 Port Hudson Photo Tour - CivilWarAlbum.com
 Port Hudson Photos - The Wandering Rebel

American Civil War battlefields
Louisiana in the American Civil War
Louisiana State Historic Sites
Museums in East Feliciana Parish, Louisiana
American Civil War museums in Louisiana
Protected areas of East Feliciana Parish, Louisiana
National Historic Landmarks in Louisiana
National Register of Historic Places in East Feliciana Parish, Louisiana